Nicolas Maréchal (born 4 March 1987) is a French professional volleyball player with Polish citizenship (since 8 April 2013), a former member of the France national team. The 2015 European Champion, and the 2015 World League winner. At the professional club level, he plays for Modena Volley.

Personal life
On 4 August 2015, his girlfriend Vatsana Phrasathane gave birth to their son Nathan.

Career
He played for Polish club Jastrzębski Węgiel in the 2013/2014 season, winning a bronze medal in the Polish Championship 2012/2013 and another in the CEV Champions League 2014 after winning a match against VC Zenit-Kazan. In 2014 he left Jastrzębski Węgiel. On May 29, 2014, it was announced that Marechal would play for PGE Skra Bełchatów in the upcoming 2014/2015 season. On October 8, 2014 his team won ENEA Polish SuperCup 2014. On October 18, 2015 French national team, including Marechal, achieved title of the European Champion 2015 (3–0 with Slovenia in the finale). On February 7, 2016 he played with PGE Skra and won the 2016 Polish Cup after beating ZAKSA in the final. In April 2016 he was a member of the same team which won a bronze medal in the 2015–16 PlusLiga championship. Few days later, he left club and went to Turkish team İstanbul Belediyesi. In 2020 he started playing for german club VFB Friedrichshafen

Honours

Clubs
 CEV Challenge Cup
  2017/2018 – with Bunge Ravenna

 National championships
 2008/2009  French Championship, with Tourcoing LM
 2010/2011  French Championship, with Stade Poitevin Poitiers
 2011/2012  French Championship, with Stade Poitevin Poitiers
 2014/2015  Polish SuperCup, with PGE Skra Bełchatów
 2015/2016  Polish Cup, with PGE Skra Bełchatów

Youth national team
 2005  CEV U19 European Championship
 2006  CEV U20 European Championship

Individual awards
 2012: French Championship – Best Receiver
 2015: Polish Championship – Best Server

References

External links

 
 Player profile at LegaVolley.it 
 Player profile at PlusLiga.pl 
 Player profile at Volleybox.net 

1987 births
Living people
Sportspeople from Pas-de-Calais
French men's volleyball players
Olympic volleyball players of France
Volleyball players at the 2016 Summer Olympics
French expatriate sportspeople in Poland
Expatriate volleyball players in Poland
French expatriate sportspeople in Turkey
Expatriate volleyball players in Turkey
French expatriate sportspeople in Italy
Expatriate volleyball players in Italy
French expatriate sportspeople in Russia
Expatriate volleyball players in Russia
French expatriate sportspeople in Germany
Expatriate volleyball players in Germany
AS Cannes Volley-Ball players
Jastrzębski Węgiel players
Skra Bełchatów players
Resovia (volleyball) players
Modena Volley players
Outside hitters